Burak Karaduman (born February 23, 1985 in Ankara, Turkey) is a Turkish footballer who plays for Denizlispor.

References

External links
 
 

1985 births
Living people
Turkish footballers
Turkey under-21 international footballers
Turkey youth international footballers
Süper Lig players
MKE Ankaragücü footballers
Konyaspor footballers
TFF First League players
Association football midfielders